The John Lueschen House is a historic building located in the West End of Davenport, Iowa, United States. It is located in what was historically a German ethnic neighborhood. Little is known of the early inhabitants of the house, however, John Lueschen, a butcher who owned a meat market on Washington Street, lived here in the late 19th century. The small Greek Revival style residence features a simple design with shallow triangular window heads and a broad molded cornice frieze. The house has been listed on the National Register of Historic Places since 1984.

References

Houses completed in 1865
Greek Revival houses in Iowa
Houses in Davenport, Iowa
Houses on the National Register of Historic Places in Iowa
National Register of Historic Places in Davenport, Iowa